Newport railway station was established in 1862 with the opening of the Cowes and Newport Railway. It was enlarged in December 1875 when the lines to Ryde and Ventnor were opened. The station was also used by the Freshwater, Yarmouth and Newport Railway from its opening in 1888 until 1913, when that company opened its own station nearby. Upon the formation of the Southern Railway in 1923 reverted to using this station. The station was closed by British Railways in 1966. It was then used as a base for the Wight Locomotive Society until January 1971, when it was demolished.

Isle of Wight Central Railway station
Newport railway station was a pivotal station within the unique railway network on the Isle of Wight, that began in 1862 when the Cowes and Newport Railway opened for business. Situated in the centre of the town, the station was enlarged in 1875 with the opening of the Ryde and Newport Railway in December 1875, which also connected the station to Ventnor. Traffic was also increased with the opening of the branch to Sandown in 1879, by the Isle of Wight (Newport Junction) Railway. In July 1887 The Cowes and Newport Railway, the Ryde and Newport Railway, and the Isle of Wight (Newport Junction) Railway were merged to form the Isle of Wight Central Railway (IWCR).

A major employer on the island, it was noted for its busy and purposeful camaraderie. Closed in 1966, the station served as a base for the Wight Locomotive Society until January 1971, when the site was demolished by scrap merchants. The station site is now built over with much of it now lost under the A3054, Medina Way.

Stationmasters

William Thomas Gubbins ca. 1864
Mr. Williams ca. 1865
Henry Thomas ca. 1871
William B.S. Greenwood 1877 - 1889 (afterwards station master at Cowes)
H. Frank Williams from 1889 (afterwards station master at Merston)
George W. Ranger 1894 - ca. 1906 (formerly station master at Cowes)
Thomas William Blanchfield ca. 1909 - 1911
Henry Young 1911 - 1927
A. Holdaway 1928 - 1936 (formerly station master at Petworth)
Percy Hawkins 1936 - 1940 (formerly station master at Ventnor)
Alex Wheway from 1941 (formerly station master at Sandown)

Freshwater Yarmouth & Newport Railway station
The trains of the Freshwater, Yarmouth and Newport Railway's terminated at the IWCR station from the opening of that line in 1888 until 1913, when a separate FYN station opened nearby. However, upon the formation of the Southern Railway, all trains to Newport reverted to using the IWCR station.

Motive power depots
The Ryde and Newport Railway opened a wooden engine shed, with coaling and watering facilities on the eastern side of Newport station on 20 December 1875 The Freshwater Yarmouth and Newport Railway also opened a small shed close to the site of Newport Priory, but this was closed upon the formation of the Southern Railway.

See also 
 List of closed railway stations in Britain

References

External links 
Enthusiasts' photos
The Quay Arts Centre at Geograph

Disused railway stations on the Isle of Wight
Former Isle of Wight Central Railway stations
Railway stations in Great Britain opened in 1862
Railway stations in Great Britain closed in 1966
Beeching closures in England
Newport, Isle of Wight
1862 establishments in England
1966 disestablishments in England